Tigbourne Court is an Arts and Crafts style country house in Wormley, Surrey, England,  south of Witley. It was designed by architect Edwin Lutyens, using a mixture of 17th-century style vernacular architecture and classical elements, and has been called "probably his best" building, for its architectural geometry, wit and texture. It was completed in 1901. English Heritage have designated it a Grade I listed building.

House

Lutyens was commissioned in 1899 by businessman Edgar Horne, who later became the chairman of the Prudential Assurance Company and Member of Parliament for Guildford. Gerald Balfour, the future Earl of Balfour, viewed the house as it was being built, was impressed, and commissioned Fisher's Hill House, Woking from Lutyens in 1900. By 1901, however, faults in the building work at Tigbourne Court had created an "awful mess", with Horne "very cross", in Lutyens's words. In that year Lutyens ended his partnership with E. Baynes Badcock, whom he blamed for the construction problems at Tigbourne Court and elsewhere.

The entrance front has a three-storey range of three gables, featuring narrow windows with pediments and brick mullions. It has a Doric entrance portico, with paired columns. Single-storey wings project forward along the sides of the entrance court, each terminating in a pair of large chimneys and a concave screen wall facing onto the road.

The house is built of Bargate stone, with galleting of the mortar using pieces of ironstone, and decorated with brick. There are decorative bands of red tiles, laid in a herringbone pattern.

Tigbourne Court is privately owned. To the south of the main house, Lutyens built Tigbourne Cottage, using the same materials. The cottage is Grade II listed.

Garden
The planting of the garden was by garden designer Gertrude Jekyll. She designed the terrace, pergola and well, which are Grade II listed.

Notes

References

External links

Arts and Crafts architecture in England
Grade I listed buildings in Surrey
Grade I listed houses
Country houses in Surrey
Houses completed in 1901
Works of Edwin Lutyens in England
Gardens in Surrey
Gardens by Gertrude Jekyll